William Neill  (1929 – 27 October 1997) was a Northern Irish footballer who played in the Irish League with Glentoran from 1950 to 1963. With the Glens, he won the Irish League championship in 1952–53, the Gold Cup twice, the City Cup and the Ulster Cup once each. He was capped fourteen times by the Irish League XI between 1952 and 1959, and played in unofficial Northern Ireland matches in a tour of North America (1953) and against South Africa (1958). He was named the Ulster Footballer of the Year for the 1959–60 season.

The Billy Neill MBE Soccer School of Excellence in Dundonald, County Down is named after him.

Sources
Billy Neill, Northern Ireland's Footballing Greats

References

Association footballers from Northern Ireland
Football managers from Northern Ireland
NIFL Premiership players
NIFL Premiership managers
Ulster Footballers of the Year
Glentoran F.C. players
Glentoran F.C. managers
Members of the Order of the British Empire
Association footballers from Belfast
1997 deaths
1929 births
Irish League representative players
Association football wing halves